The Beekman family (sometimes spelled Beeckman) is a family of Dutch descent that was prominent during the 17th, 18th, and 19th centuries in the area now known as the state of New York. Members of this family played a critical role in the formation of the United States and served as leaders in business, politics and society.

History

The name Beekman is from "beck," the Dutch word for "mouth," the English "beak," or an abbreviation of "bekken," the Dutch word for basin. "According to Putnam's Historic New York, 'Beekman or the man of the brook; this interpretation of the name was recognized by heralds during the reign of King James I of England when the arms granted to the Rev. Mr. Beekman, grandfather of William, as a coat of arms, a rivulet running between roses." The crest is three feathers on a helmet of steel represented in profile. The motto is: Mens conscia Recti."

The progenitor of the American Beekmans, Wilhelmus Beekman of Overijssel, came to New Amsterdam in the Dutch province of New Netherlands in 1647. The Beekman estates were in Flatbush, Long Island. His ancestors were residents of the country of the Rhine, and a branch of the family were Barons of Belgium. Wilhelmus' grandfather, Cornelius Beekman, was a wealthy burgher of Cologne, who resided on the Rhine in Germany.

Notable members
 Wilhelmus Beekman (1623–1707), Treasurer of the Dutch West India Company, Governor of Delaware and Pennsylvania, 1653/58-1663
 Hendrick Beekman (1652–1716), Governor of Delaware, Mayor of New York City, namesake of the town of Beekman, New York
 Gerardus Beekman (1653–1723), colonel, surgeon, Governor of the Province of New York
 Henry Beekman (1687–1775), prominent colonial American politician and landowner
 James Beekman (1732–1807), New York City merchant
 John P. Beekman (1788–1861), New York physician and politician
 Thomas Beekman (1790–1870), American politician, U.S. Representative from New York
 James William Beekman (1815–1877), New York City landowner
 Henry Rutgers Beekman (1845–1900), justice of the Supreme Court of New York and New York City Parks Commissioner
 Daniel H. Beekman (1874–1951), New Jersey attorney, judge, banker, and Democratic politician.

Family tree

 Rev. Gerardus Beekman (1558–1625) m. Agnes Stunning (1557–1614)
 Martin "Hendrick" Beekman (1585–1642) m. (1) Gertruyd Gommersbach (1589–1619) m. (2) 1621: Maritje "Mary" Baudartius (1600–1630); m. (3) Alida Ottenbeek (b. 1605)
 Gerardus Beekman (1622–1678) m. Joanna Plautius
 Wilhelmus Beekman (1623–1707) m. 1649 Catalina de Boogh
 Maria Beekman (1650–1679) m. Nicholas William Stuyvesant
 Hendrick Beekman (1652–1716) m. Jannetje "Johanna" (née de Loper) Davidson (1650–1743)
 Wilhelmus "William" Beekman (1682–1700)
 Catryntie "Catharine" Beekman (1683–1745) m. (1): Cornelius Exveen m. (2): Johannes "John" Rutsen m. (3): Albert Pawling
 Henry Beekman (1687–1775) m. (1): Janet Livingston (d. 1724); m. (2) Gertrude Van Cortlandt
 Margaret Beekman (1724–1800) m. Robert Livingston (1718–1775)
 Robert R. Livingston (1746–1813) m. Mary Stevens
 Janet Livingston (d. 1824) m. Gen. Richard Montgomery (1738–1775)
 Margaret Livingston (1749–1823) m. Thomas Tillotson (1750–1832)
 Henry Beekman Livingston (1750–1831) m. Anne Hume Shippen (1763–1841)
 Catharine Livingston m. Freeborn Garrettson
 John R. Livingston (1755–1851) m. 1779: Margaret Sheafe; m. (2) 1789: Eliza McEvers
 Gertrude Livingston (1757–1833) m. Morgan Lewis (1754–1844)
 Joanna Livingston (1759–1827) m. Peter R. Livingston (1766–1847)
 Alida Livingston (1761–1822) m. John Armstrong Jr. (1758–1843)
 Edward Livingston (1764–1836) m. (1) 1788: Mary McEvers; m. (2) Madame Louise Moreau de Lassy (née Davezac) in 1805
 Cornelia Beekman (1693–1742) m. Gilbert Livingston.
 Margaret Livingston m. Peter Stuyvesant
 Joanna Livingston m. Pierre Van Cortlandt
 Gerardus Beekman (1653–1723) m. 1677: Magdalena Abeel (–1745)
 Divertje "Deborah" Beekman (1674–1737) m. Theunis Hendricksen Wiltse (1674–1741)
 William Beekman (1684–1770) m. Catharine Delanoy (1691–1765)
 James Beekman (1732–1807) m. 1752: Janneke "Jane" Keteltas (1734–1817)
 Abraham Keteltas Beekman (1756–1816) m. Johanna Beekman
 James Beekman Jr. (1758–1837) m. Lydia Watkins Drew
 Jane Beekman (b. 1760) m. Stephen Van Cortlandt
 Catharine "Caty" Beekman (b. 1762) m. Elisha Boudinot
 Mary Beekman (b. 1765) m. Stephen N. Bayard
 John Beekman (1768–1843) m. Mary Elizabeth Goad Bedlow (1771–1848)
 William Fenwick Beekman (1809–1872) m. Catherine Alexander Neilson (1814–1892)
 Henry Rutgers Beekman (1845–1900) m. Isabella Lawrence 
 Henry Rutgers Beekman (1880–1937) 
 Gerard Beekman (1774–1833) m. Catharine Saunders (1785–1835)
 James William Beekman (1815–1877) m. Abian Ann Steele Milledoler (1819–1897)
 Catherine Beekman (1841–1923) m. William W. Hoppin Jr. (1840–1913)
 Gerard Beekman (1842–1918)
 Philip Milledoller Beekman (1845–1846)
 James William Beekman Jr. (1847–1908)
 Cornelia Augusta Beekman (1849–1917)
 Adrian Beekman (1682–1705) m. Aletta Lispenard (–1705)
 Gerardus Beekman (1693–1746) m. (1): Anna Maria van Horne (1696–1726); m. (2) 1727: Catharine Provoost 
 Gerardus Garret Beekman (1719–1796) m. Anna van Horne (1726–1746)
 Gerardus Garret Beekman Jr. (1746–1822) m. 1772: Cornelia Van Cortlandt (1753–1847)
 Ann Beekman (1778–1857) m. 1803: Frederick de Peyster (1758–1834)
 Frederic de Peyster II (1796–1882) m. (1) 1820: Mary Justina Watts; m. (2) 1839: Maria Antoinette (née Kane) Hone
 John Watts de Peyster (1821–1907) m. Estelle Livingston (1819–1898)
 Cornelia Beekman (1655–1679) m. 1674: Isaac Van Vleck
 Johannes Beekman (1656–1751) m. Aeltje Thomas Popinga
 Thomas Beekman (1689–1759) m. Maria Wynkoop (1693–1758)
 Johannes Beekman (1723–1792) m. Lydia Van Keurew (–1795)
 John J. Beekman (1761–1795) m. Annatje Pruyn
 John P. Beekman (1788–1861) m. 1821: Eliza Griffith Clark (1792–1875)
 Thomas Beekman (1790–1870) m. Lydia Van Schaack
 Marteen Hendricksz Beekman (1624–1711) m. Susanna Janz Labattie
 Hendrick Beekman (1645–) m. Annetje Quackenbosch
 Susanna Beekman m. Tunis Jans Van Middleswaert (1682–1742)
 Maria Beekman (1697–1744) m. Pieter Fonda (b. 1697)
 Johannes Beekman (1657–1732) m. (1) Machtelt Schermerhorn; m. (2) Eva Vinhagen
 Johannes Beekman Jr. (1684–1741) m. 1714: Esther Wendell (b. 1686)
 Jacob Beekman (1685–1739) m. 1714: Debora Hansen
 Johannes Jacobse Beekman (1733–1802) m. 1759: Maria Sanders (1740–1794)
 Deborah Beekman (1763–1791) m. 1787: John De Peyster Douw (1756–1835)
 Maritje "Mary" Beekman (b. 1692) m. 1710: Arnout Schermerhorn (1686–1749)
 Johannes "John" Schermerhorn (1715–1768) m. Sarah Cannon (1721–1762)
 Peter Schermerhorn (1749–1826) m. 1771: Elizabeth Bussing
 Abraham Schermerhorn (1783–1850) m. Helen Van Courtlandt White (1792–1881)
 Caroline Webster Schermerhorn (1830–1908) m. William Backhouse Astor Jr. (1829–1892)
 Martin Beekman (1695–) m. 1721: Geertruy Visscher
 Johannes Beekman (1722–1790) m. (1) 1754: Maria Nicolls; m. (2) 1764: Elizabeth Douw
 Eva Beekman (1734–1803) m. Abraham Schuyler (1735–1812)
 Hendrick Beekman (1707–1755) m. Annetje "Anna" Swits (b. 1712)
 Johannes Beekman (1738–1794) m. Hendrickje van Buren (b. )
 Henry Beekman (1774–1857) m. Catherine McPhaedris Livingston (1789–1863)
 Helen Smith Beekman (1817–1896) m. John Andrew Graham (1808–1883)
 Gilbert Livingston Beeckman (1823–1874) m. Margaret Atherton Foster (1832–1904) 
 Katherine Livingston Beeckman (1855–1941) m. Louis Lasher Lorillard (1849–1910)
 Margaret Atherton Beeckman (1861–1951) m. (1) Campbell Steward (1852–1936)
 Martha Beeckman (1863–1951)  m. Amos Tuck French (1863–1941)
 Robert Livingston Beeckman (1866–1935) m. (1) 1902: Eleanor Thomas (d. 1920); m. (2) 1923: Edna (née Marston) Burke

Gallery

See also
Beekman Place

References

American people of Dutch descent
People of the Province of New York